The Road to Paradise (French: Le chemin du paradis) is a 1956 French-German romantic comedy film directed by Willi Forst and Hans Wolff and starring Georges Guétary, Christine Carère and Claude Farell. The film is the French version of the 1955 German film The Three from the Filling Station, which was itself a remake of a 1930 film.

Cast

See also
The Road to Paradise (1930)

References

Bibliography
 Bergfelder, Tim & Bock, Hans-Michael. ''The Concise Cinegraph: Encyclopedia of German. Berghahn Books, 2009.

External links 
 

1956 films
1956 musical comedy films
German musical comedy films
West German films
1950s French-language films
French musical comedy films
Films directed by Hans Wolff
Films directed by Willi Forst
Remakes of German films
Remakes of French films
French multilingual films
1950s multilingual films
1950s French films
1950s German films